Charles Henry Sanders (born August 22, 1979) is an American actor, comedian, and Writers Guild Award–winning writer best known for starring as Officer Joe Stubeck in the MTV comedy-action series Death Valley, writing on all five seasons of Key & Peele and creating the YouTube Premium series Weird City. He is currently hosting the hit podcast 'Bald Talk' on iHeartMedia with comedian and actor Brian Huskey.

Early life
Sanders was born in Minneapolis, Minnesota - the eldest of three brothers - and grew up in Saint Paul where he graduated from St. Paul Central High School in 1998. While in high school he participated in Central Touring Theatre Company (alongside fellow comedians Nick Swardson and Colton Dunn) as well as the swim team and later began performing at ComedySportz in Minneapolis.

Sanders worked at Bryant-Lake Bowl doing sound for comedy shows, while briefly attending the University of Minnesota. He then moved to New York City in 2001 where he began regularly performing improvisational comedy at the Upright Citizens Brigade Theater (UCBT), where he was a member of the improv groups "Police Chief Rumble" and "Reuben Williams". In 2004 he and his improv team "Police Chief Rumble" won "Best Sketch Group" at the Emerging Comics of New York Awards. Sanders now performs at the UCBT's Los Angeles division with his current sketch group "Shitty Jobs".

Career
Sanders has appeared as a sketch regular on Late Night with Conan O'Brien for several years and has appeared in films such as When in Rome and Cedar Rapids. Sanders currently stars as Officer Joe Stubeck in the MTV comedy-action Death Valley and has made recurring appearances on comedy programs such as Funny or Die Presents and Childrens Hospital. For a number of years he was part of the sketch-comedy trio "The Buffoons" with comedians Bobby Moynihan and Eugene Cordero. The trio performed regularly at the Upright Citizens Brigade Theater and also at Montreal's "Just For Laughs" Comedy Festival in 2007. Sanders also performed his one-man show "Minnesota Muslim" for several years, which was praised in Time Out NY and New York Magazine.

Sanders has written for sketch-comedy programs such MTV's Human Giant and currently on the Comedy Central series Key & Peele. Sanders also wrote the Funny or Die produced short film "The Big Dog", which he starred in alongside Bob Odenkirk and Rich Sommer.

References

External links

1979 births
Living people
American male comedians
21st-century American comedians
American male television actors
American television writers
American male television writers
Male actors from Minneapolis
Upright Citizens Brigade Theater performers
Screenwriters from Minnesota
21st-century American screenwriters
21st-century American male writers